Geospatial PDF is a set of geospatial extensions to the Portable Document Format (PDF) 1.7 specification to include information that relates a region in the document page to a region in physical space — called georeferencing. A geospatial PDF can contain geometry such as points, lines, and polygons. These, for example, could represent building locations, road networks and city boundaries, respectively. The georeferencing metadata for geospatial PDF is most commonly encoded in one of two ways: the OGC best practice; and as Adobe's proposed geospatial extensions to ISO 32000. The specifications also allow geometry to have attributes, such as a name or identifying type.

ISO 32000-2 (PDF 2.0), completed in 2017, incorporates geospatial PDF features.

Overview 
The popularity of geographic information systems (GIS) and geospatial technology amongst its users has increased the need to share information. However, an obstacle to sharing geospatial data can sometimes be the large file sizes or that the end recipient does not have the appropriate software or reader. The PDF format is widely accepted and is considered the de facto standard for printable documents on the web. This means that users do not require the any proprietary plug-in to read geospatial PDFs created following the PDF 1.7 specification, which was published as ISO 32000-1 standard. In this vein, some features commonly associated with geospatial PDF are simply features of PDF:
 Graphically represent vector and raster information (content and imaging model, PDF 1.0)
 Separate graphics content into different layers (optional content, PDF 1.5)
 Associate of tabular information with graphical features (user properties, PDF 1.6)

Uses 
There are many uses for a geospatial PDF. After importing geospatial data into PDF, one can use the data in a variety of ways:

 Find and mark location coordinates.
 Measure distance, perimeter, and area.
 Change the coordinate system and measurement units.
 Copy location coordinates to the clipboard, and then use them to show locations in several web mapping services.
 Register a raster image to create a geospatially aware PDF.

Support 

There are several software developers that adhere to the PDF 1.7 specification for writing geospatial PDF files:
 Avenza Systems
 Bentley
 Cadcorp
 ESRI
 Pitney Bowes
 QGIS
 SAFE Software
 TerraGo Technologies
 Hexagon Geospatial
 SDI

See also 
 GeoPDF
 Cartography
 Coordinate system
 GIS
 Graphic file formats
 Geographic projection
 Scalable Vector Graphics

References

External links
 Avenza MAPublisher and Geographic Imager Geospatial PDF Export
 ESRI Technology Topics
 MapInfo Professional User Guide
 PDF Maps app for Apple iOS
 SAFE Software PDF writer specification

Adobe Inc.
GIS vector file formats